Acalypha hontauyuensis is a species of plant in the family Euphorbiaceae. It is a shrub endemic to Orchid Island, Taiwan. The Flora of China, however, lists it as a synonym of Acalypha suirenbiensis from the Taiwanese mainland.

Habitat and conservation
Acalypha hontauyuensis grows in dry scrub. It is locally abundant but vulnerable to habitat loss.

References

hontauyuensis
Endemic flora of Taiwan
Taxonomy articles created by Polbot